Deja vous may refer to:

 A common misspelling and pun on the French phrase déjà vu

Music
 "Deja Vous", a song by Headkase from the albums The Beginning (2001) and The Worm County Circus (2011)
 "Deja Vous", a song by Lucky Boys Confusion from the 1998 album Growing Out of It
 "Deja Vous", a song by Siegel–Schwall Band from the 2005 album Flash Forward
 "Déjà Vous", a song by Rosita Vai from the 2005 album Golden

See also
 Deja vu (disambiguation)
 DejaView, a Canadian television channel